Dhak Balaloan  is a village in Phagwara Tehsil in Kapurthala district of Punjab State, India. The village is administrated by a Sarpanch, who is an elected representative.

Demography 
According to the report published by Census India in 2011, Dhak Balaloan has 73 houses with the total population of 405 persons of which 193 are male and 212 females. Literacy rate of Dhak Balaloan is 80.22%, higher than the state average of 75.84%.  The population of children in the age group 0–6 years is 36 which is  8.89% of the total population.  Child sex ratio is approximately 1769, higher than the state average of 846.

Population data

References

External links
  Villages in Kapurthala
 Kapurthala Villages List

Villages in Kapurthala district